Qaleh Bin or Qaleh Beyn may refer to:
 Qaleh Bin, Ardabil
 Qaleh Bin, Talesh, Gilan Province
 Qaleh Bin, Kargan Rud, Talesh County, Gilan Province